Oktapodi is a 2007 French computer-animated short film that originated as a Graduate Student Project from Gobelins L'Ecole de L'Image. The film is about a pair of love struck octopuses who through a series of comical events are separated and must find each other. Oktapodi was directed by Julien Bocabeille, François-Xavier Chanioux, Olivier Delabarre, Thierry Marchand, Quentin Marmier, and Emud Mokhberi. Music was composed by Kenny Wood.

Oktapodi was well received, winning a number of awards, as well as an Academy Award nomination for Best Short Film (Animated) for the 81st Academy Awards. It was also included in the Animation Show of Shows.

Plot
Two octopuses fight for their lives with a stubborn restaurant cook in a comical escape through the streets of a seaside town in Greece.

Awards and nominations

Legacy
The Academy Film Archive preserved the film under the ACME Filmworks collection.

See also
Le Building - a 2005 animated short film, also directed by students at Gobelins

References

External links
 
  Official Homepage

2007 comedy films
2007 films
Computer-animated short films
French animated films
2000s French-language films
Student films
2007 computer-animated films
2007 short films
French comedy short films
Films about cephalopods
2000s French films